Raffenaldia is a genus of flowering plants belonging to the family Brassicaceae.

It is native to Algeria and Morocco in northern Africa.
  
The genus name of Raffenaldia is in honour of Alire Raffeneau Delile (1778–1850), a French botanist. 
It was first described and published in Mém. Sect. Med. Acad. Sci. Montpellier Vol.1 on page 413 in 1853.

Known species, according to Kew:
Raffenaldia platycarpa 
Raffenaldia primuloides

References

Brassicaceae
Brassicaceae genera
Plants described in 1853
Flora of Algeria
Flora of Morocco